The Primary routes of National Trunk Highway System Expressways of China are numbered with one- or two-digit designations. Generally, one-digit routes radiate from Beijing, for two-digit routes, odd-numbered routes under 90 run north-south, with lower numbers in the east and higher numbers in the west; even-numbered routes under 90 run east-west, with lower numbers in the north and higher numbers in the south; while 9X routes are zonal beltways.

Their associated branch expressways are using four-digit designations, with the first two digits selected from this list, see the separate linked list for details.

In this list under Number column, the gray colored routes are not yet completed. These routes are officially printed in the 2022 National Highway Network Plan.

Primary NTHS Expressways

Zonal Ring Expressways

See also
 Expressways of China
 List of auxiliary NTHS Expressways

References

NTHS Expressways
NTHS
NTHS Expressways